Kona Ice is a mobile shaved ice company,. The company was founded by Tony Lamb in 2007. Lamb is Kona Ice's CEO. It was named one of the fastest growing franchises in the United States. The company's mascot is an animated penguin named Kona.

History
In 2007, Tony Lamb founded Kona Ice after deciding that he wanted to build a better ice cream truck. By the end of the year, he had designed and produced five prototypes. Kona Ice began franchising in 2008. In October 2012, the company launched the Kona Mini, a smaller replica of the Kona Ice truck, to sell shaved ice indoors during winter months. Kona Ice was recognized on Entrepreneur magazine's Franchise 500 list in 2013. The company was also named the top new franchise and rated the 27th fastest growing franchise in the United States.

In 2014, Kona Ice partnered with Northern Kentucky University for an internship program. In April 2015, Kona Ice partnered with Make-A-Wish Foundation. The company has donated $25 million to community-based organizations since its foundation. In May 2014, Kona Ice was named one of the top eight franchises in the United States by TheStreet.com.

Operations
Kona Ice is headquartered in Florence, Kentucky. As of March 2015, the company had more than 1000 franchise locations in 43 states and others across Canada. Customers can customize their shaved ice with the Flavorwave, a patented flavor dispenser built into the side of the truck. Kona Ice shaved ice contains 60 percent less sugar than regular sugar water snow cones and can be made of 100 percent fruit juice in participating locations. 

The minimum investment amount required to open a Kona Ice franchise is $149,995 and can go all the way up to $189,300. The investor should also allocate additional funds to live off of while the Kona Ice business ramps up. This can take as little as 6 months to over 2 years depending on the franchise opportunity.

References

Florence, Kentucky
American companies established in 2007
Restaurants established in 2007
Ice cream vans
Companies based in Kentucky
2007 establishments in Kentucky
Companies based in Boone County, Kentucky